There are at least four known endothelin receptors, ETA, ETB1, ETB2 and ETC, all of which are G protein-coupled receptors whose activation result in elevation of intracellular-free calcium, which constricts the smooth muscles of the blood vessels, raising blood pressure, or relaxes the smooth muscles of the blood vessels, lowering blood pressure, among other functions.

Physiological functions
ETA is a subtype for vasoconstriction These receptors are found in the smooth muscle tissue of blood vessels, and binding of endothelin to ETA increases vasoconstriction (contraction of the blood vessel walls) and the retention of sodium, leading to increased blood pressure.
ETB1 mediates vasodilation, When endothelin binds to ETB1 receptors, this leads to the release of nitric oxide (also called endothelium-derived relaxing factor), natriuresis and diuresis (the production and elimination of urine) and mechanisms that lower blood pressure.
ETB2 mediates vasoconstriction
ETC has yet no clearly defined function.
ET receptors are also found in the nervous system where they may mediate neurotransmission and vascular functions.

Brain and nerves
Widely distributed in the body, receptors for endothelin are present in blood vessels and cells of the brain, choroid plexus and peripheral nerves. When applied directly to the brain of rats in picomolar quantities as an experimental model of stroke, endothelin-1 caused severe metabolic stimulation and seizures with substantial decreases in blood flow to the same brain regions, both effects mediated by calcium channels.

A similar strong vasoconstrictor action of endothelin-1 was demonstrated in a peripheral neuropathy model in rats.

Clinical significance 

Mutations in the EDNRB gene are associated with ABCD syndrome and some forms of Waardenburg syndrome.

See also
 Endothelin receptor antagonist

References

Further reading
 Davenport AP, Hyndman KA,  Dhaun N,   Southan C,  Kohan DE,  Pollock JS, Pollock DM,  Webb DJ, Maguire JJ. (2016) 'Endothelin'  Pharmacol. Rev. 68: 357-418. pmid =26956245  doi =10.1124/pr.115.011833

External links

G protein-coupled receptors